Huszczka Mała  is a village in the administrative district of Gmina Skierbieszów.

Location
The village is located within Zamość County, Lublin Voivodeship, in eastern Poland.

References

Villages in Zamość County